The following highways are numbered 33A:

United States
Missouri Route 33A (former)
 Nevada State Route 33A (former)
 New York State Route 33A
 County Route 33A (Rockland County, New York)
 County Route 33A (Suffolk County, New York)